Exostosin-1 is a protein that in humans is encoded by the EXT1 gene.

This gene encodes one of the two endoplasmic reticulum-resident type II transmembrane glycosyltransferase – the other being EXT2 – which are involved in the chain elongation step of heparan sulfate biosynthesis. Mutations in this gene cause the type I form of multiple exostoses.

Interactions
EXT1 has been shown to interact with TRAP1.

See also
 Langer–Giedion syndrome
 Hereditary multiple exostoses type 1

References

Further reading

External links
 Multiple Hereditary Exostoses Research Foundation